Pavel Avksentyev (born 1890, date of death unknown) was a Russian swimmer. He competed in two events at the 1912 Summer Olympics.

References

External links
 

1890 births
Year of death missing
Male swimmers from the Russian Empire
Olympic competitors for the Russian Empire
Swimmers at the 1912 Summer Olympics
Swimmers from Saint Petersburg